Qatabānian (or Qatabānic), one of the four better-documented languages of the Old South Arabian (or "Ṣayhadic") sub-group of South Semitic, was spoken mainly but not exclusively in the kingdom of Qatabān, located in central Yemen. The language is attested between 500 BC and 200 AD. Some two thousand inscriptions are known written in the Ancient South Arabian Monumental Script, known as Musnad. These inscriptions are mainly found in Wādī Bayhān and Wādī Ḥārib to the south-east of Ma'rib, and from the plateau to the south of that area. Qatabanian inscriptions increase after the beginning of the 4th century BC when the Sabaeans ceased to dominate the area, and Qatabān became an independent kingdom.

Qatabanian was spoken in an area across the kingdom of Qatabān as far as Jabal al-'Awd (near Zafar) in the southwest, and if we are to believe the Greek and Latin writers, it went as far as Bāb al-Mandab on the Red Sea. At the end of the 2nd century AD, Saba' and Ḥaḑramawt finally defeated Qatabān, and the inscriptions ended.

The language used to write inscriptions in the kingdom of Awsān, known as Awsānian (or Awsānite) is virtually identical to Qatabānic, but it is so badly attested (25 inscriptions), that it remains uncertain whether it is a Qatabānic dialect or a distinct language.

Numerals 

Qatabānian has an unusual form for the cardinal number "one" - ṭd / fem. ṭt ; this has no known cognates in any of the ancient Semitic languages, although it does appear in modern South Arabian languages (cf. Jibbālī ṭad, fem. ṭit). Qatabānian also has another word for "one", ˤs1tn, which is cognate with the Minaean ˤs1t (and with forms in Akkadian, Ugaritic and Hebrew). The Qatabānian forms for "three" and "six" are the same as the Old Sabaean words: s2lṯ (fem. s2lṯt) and s1dṯ (fem. s1dṯt).

Qatabānian expresses distributives by repeating the number, thus: b-ˤs2r ˤs2r ḫbṣtm mṣˤm l-ṭt ṭt ywmm "ten full Ḫabṣat coins each for each day".

References

Bibliography 
 
 
 
 
 

Languages attested from the 5th century BC
Old South Arabian languages
Languages of Yemen